The Saxon Stories (also known as Saxon Tales/Saxon Chronicles in the US and The Warrior Chronicles and most recently as The Last Kingdom series) is a historical novel series written by Bernard Cornwell about the birth of England in the ninth and tenth centuries. The series consists of 13 novels. The protagonist of the series is Uhtred of Bebbanburg, born to a Saxon lord in Northumbria. He is captured as a child and raised by a Danish warlord. The name of the fictional protagonist comes from the historical Uhtred the Bold; Cornwell is a descendant of this family.

The story begins with the conquest of all but one of the major Saxon kingdoms by the Danes, with Wessex, the last kingdom, nearly overrun.  Alfred the Great, King of Wessex, rallies his forces and begins the long struggle to fulfill his ambition of uniting all English speakers in one realm. Uhtred, despite his inclinations otherwise, repeatedly fights and schemes to bring about Alfred's dream over the course of a long life.

The first ten novels in the series were adapted for five seasons of the television series The Last Kingdom, starring Alexander Dreymon. The first two seasons were made by the BBC.  A third, fourth and fifth season were produced by Netflix. Cornwell subsequently posted a note on his web site that "The Warrior Chronicles/Saxon Stories had been renamed The Last Kingdom series".

Background
In an interview with Emerson College, Cornwell said: "Years ago, when I was at university, I discovered Anglo-Saxon poetry and became hooked on that strange and often melancholy world. For some reason the history of the Anglo-Saxons isn’t much taught in Britain (where I grew up) and it struck me as weird that the English really had no idea where their country came from. Americans know, they even have a starting date, but the English just seemed to assume that England had always been there, so the idea of writing a series about the creation of England was in my head for a long time." The historical setting is the big story; writing historical fiction needs a little story so the history can be the background. When he was in his fifties, Cornwell met his birth father, named William Outhred (or Oughtred), and learned the story of his own descent from the Saxons who owned the fortress of Bebbanburg (now Bamburgh Castle). Thus was born Uhtred, the protagonist of the fictional tales.

In the interview, he revealed that there is a plan to adapt the series for television, in answer to a question of how many more books are planned for the series. "I wish I knew! I don’t know how the chapter I’m writing now will end, let alone the book, and the series? No idea! I suspect there will be a few more; I just heard that BBC Television have commissioned a series that will follow Uhtred’s escapades. The company that makes Downton Abbey will make the programs, which is wonderful, and I’ll need to keep them supplied with stories (I hope). So? Six more? Eight more? I just don’t know."

When the television adaptation of the first two novels aired in autumn of 2015, Cornwell reiterated how the idea took shape in his mind when he met his birth father in Canada. Cornwell's paternal ancestors were traced to the time of Alfred; the family holding Bebbanburg was betrayed in the 11th century and fled to Yorkshire.

Overview

Uhtred, the protagonist, is the second son of a Saxon lord who rules from the nearly impregnable fortress at Bebbanburg (modern-day Bamburgh) in the kingdom of Northumbria. Danish raiders kill first his older brother, then his father. Uhtred himself is spared only because the Danish leader, Ragnar the Fearless, is amused when the youngster attacks him. Ragnar takes Uhtred home and raises the boy like one of his own sons. Uhtred abandons Christianity in favour of Danish pagan beliefs, such as the gods Thor and Odin, Valhalla, and the Norns. In particular, he believes that "Wyrd bið ful āræd" ("Fate is inexorable").

When he is an adult, that fate drives him to serve Alfred the Great, whom he dislikes but respects, and Alfred's dream of uniting all English speakers into a single kingdom, Englaland. To his great disgust, Uhtred finds himself saving Alfred's Christian kingdom of Wessex (and other Saxon kingdoms) time and time again from those who threaten it, primarily the pagan Danes who have settled in Britain, despite despising Christianity and admiring the Danes. When Wessex is overrun and Alfred is at his lowest point, a fugitive with few followers hiding in a marsh, it is Uhtred who convinces him to fight back rather than give up and go into exile.

Uhtred's overriding ambition, however, is to take Bebbanburg, stolen from him by his uncle after his father's death.

The story is told almost entirely from Uhtred's first-person perspective. The reader knows only what Uhtred knows or learns. (The prologue of The Empty Throne is written from the perspective of Uhtred's second son, before reverting to Uhtred's viewpoint.)

Cornwell provides a "Historical Note" at the end of each novel in which he clarifies which characters and events are based on actual history and what liberties he took with them.

Style
The series is frequently compared to The Warlord Chronicles, not only because of similarities between the two protagonists (both were orphaned), but also in the similarities between the foreign menace in the form of the Danes in The Saxon Stories and the Saxons in The Warlord Chronicles. Alfred also resembles Arthur in his mission as the only man to save his kingdom (England for Alfred, southern Celtic Britain for Arthur) from an unstoppable threat.

The main character, Uhtred of Bebbanburg (the old Saxon name of Bamburgh Castle), is an old man telling tales of events that took place decades earlier, starting from his childhood and going on, his story intertwining with the story of the British Isles in the end of the ninth century. He intersperses the narrative with often acerbic comments regarding the events and characters he describes. It is notable that the Saxon-born Uhtred, baptized Christian three times, has a very critical view of the Christian religion throughout the entire series. Though he takes an oath to serve Alfred, he admires the Danes, their way of life and their gods. This offers the reader a balanced picture of the tumultuous times, when it was uncertain whether there would be an England or a "Daneland" in the southern and central parts of the island of Britain.

Series titles
This series of novels is known by several titles. Saxon Stories and Saxon Tales were the first titles in the US and the UK editions for the first five novels, and those titles continue in use for later novels. Starting with The Death of Kings, the UK editions bear the series title, The Warrior Chronicles. The series is also known as The Saxon Chronicles on US editions. In the autumn of 2015, a series of television programs based on the first two novels and using the title of the first novel – The Last Kingdom – has led booksellers to link the novels to the television series by referring to them as The Last Kingdom novels. The author renamed the series The Last Kingdom, according to a news notice at his website.

Bibliography of the Saxon Tales
Bernard Cornwell mentioned in the historical notes at the end of The Lords of the North (third novel) that he intended to continue writing The Saxon Stories. On his website, Cornwell states "I need to finish Uhtred", the main character in The Saxon Stories. On 5 March 2020, Cornwell announced on social media that the 13th book, War Lord, would be the final novel in the series.

The following novels have been published, with the UK publication date listed.

The Last Kingdom (2004)
The Pale Horseman (2005)
The Lords of the North (2006)
Sword Song (2007)
The Burning Land (2009)

Death of Kings (2011)
The Pagan Lord (2013)
The Empty Throne (2014)
Warriors of the Storm (2015)
The Flame Bearer (2016)
War of the Wolf (2018)
Sword of Kings (2019)
War Lord (October 2020)

Television adaptation

In July 2014, the BBC announced that production would begin in autumn 2014 on a television adaptation of The Saxon Stories, to be titled The Last Kingdom. Stephen Butchard is the writer. A series of eight 60-minute episodes was produced. BBC Two, Carnival Films and BBC America are involved in the production. The series premiered on BBC America on 10 October 2015 and on BBC Two in the UK on 22 October 2015.

In an interview, Cornwell said he did not believe that the success of Game of Thrones led to the decision to produce The Last Kingdom. "I don’t think so, [Game of Thrones] is fantasy, unless the appeal is brutal men in chain mail and leather beating the shit out of each other ... I can't see anything else we have in common. This is rooted in reality. And even though Uhtred didn't exist as I have written it, there is always that big story ... in the background". The big story, in Cornwell's terms, refers to the history of Alfred and the start of England.

Two series had aired by early 2018. The third, fourth and fifth, each with ten episodes, were released exclusively by its sole producer Netflix; the BBC was no longer involved. Following the airing of the fifth season, Netflix announced that the series was cancelled and would be followed by a two-hour feature film, Seven Kings Must Die, which finished filming in March 2022 in Hungary. The movie is expected to be aired on Netflix in late 2022 or early 2023.

See also 
 Anglo-Saxon warfare

References

 
Book series introduced in 2004
Cultural depictions of Alfred the Great
Fictional Vikings
HarperCollins books
Historical novels by series
Northumberland in fiction
Novel series
Novels set in the 10th century
Novels set in the 9th century
Novels set in the Viking Age